Mihir Vardhan was the 33rd Administrator of the Indian Union Territory of Lakshadweep.

External links
 Contact information
 IAS Candidate and serving with Goa government

References

|-

Administrators of Lakshadweep
Indian government officials
Living people
Year of birth missing (living people)
Place of birth missing (living people)